This is the List of municipalities in Kahramanmaraş Province, Turkey .

Municipalities and mayors 
List is sorted alphabetically A-Z, as Districts->Municipalities.

Changes in 2014
According to Law act no 6360,  belde (town) municipalities within provinces with more than 750000 population ( so called Metropolitan municipalities in Turkey) were abolished as of 30 March 2014. 52 belde municipalities in the above list are now defunct. The list is kept for historical reference.

References 

Geography of Kahramanmaraş Province
Kahramanmaras